Kiyoshi Arai is a former professional baseball player for Japan.   He initially played in the  California League for the Salinas Spurs  He later played for the Yakult Swallows in the Japan Central League.  He later played for Yokohama BayStars in the  Japan Central League and the Orix BlueWave in the Japan Pacific League.

References

1964 births
Living people
Baseball people from Gunma Prefecture
Japanese expatriate baseball players in the United States
Salinas Spurs players
Yakult Swallows players
Yokohama BayStars players
Orix BlueWave players